Pingasa multispurcata is a moth of the family Geometridae first described by Louis Beethoven Prout in 1913. It is found in Yemen, Arabia, Iraq, from Iran to Pakistan and in north-western India.

The larvae feed on Sclerocarya birrea.

References

Pseudoterpnini
Moths described in 1913
Taxa named by Louis Beethoven Prout